Alexandru Ioan Sorian (born 5 January 1991) is a Romanian professional footballer who plays as a midfielder for Lotus Băile Felix. In his career, Sorian also played for teams such as Liberty Salonta, Bihor Oradea, Săgeata Năvodari, UTA Arad or CSC Sânmartin, among others.

References

External links
 

1991 births
Living people
People from Bihor County
Romanian footballers
Association football midfielders
Liga I players
Liga II players
Liga III players
CF Liberty Oradea players
FC Bihor Oradea players
AFC Săgeata Năvodari players
FC UTA Arad players
CS Luceafărul Oradea players
Romanian expatriate footballers
Expatriate footballers in Austria
Romanian expatriate sportspeople in Austria